Hemibrycon is a genus of characins. They are mainly found in South America, Trinidad in the Caribbean), and H. dariensis of east Panama.

Species
There are currently 39 recognized species in this genus:
 Hemibrycon antioquiae Román-Valencia, Ruiz-C., Taphorn, Mancera-Rodriguez & García-Alzate, 2013 
 Hemibrycon beni N. E. Pearson, 1924
 Hemibrycon boquiae (C. H. Eigenmann, 1913)
 Hemibrycon cairoense Román-Valencia & Arcila-Mesa, 2009
 Hemibrycon cardalensis Román-Valencia, Ruiz-C., Taphorn, Mancera-Rodriguez & García-Alzate, 2013 
 Hemibrycon carrilloi Dahl, 1960
 Hemibrycon caucanus (C. H. Eigenmann, 1913) 
 Hemibrycon cristiani (Román-Valencia, 1999) 
 Hemibrycon colombianus C. H. Eigenmann, 1914
 Hemibrycon dariensis Meek & Hildebrand, 1916
 Hemibrycon decurrens (C. H. Eigenmann, 1913)
 Hemibrycon dentatus (C. H. Eigenmann, 1913)
 Hemibrycon divisorensis Bertaco, L. R. Malabarba, Hidalgo & H. Ortega, 2007
 Hemibrycon fasciatus Román-Valencia, Ruiz-C., Taphorn, Mancera-Rodriguez & García-Alzate, 2013 
 Hemibrycon galvisi (Román-Valencia, 2000) 
 Hemibrycon helleri C. H. Eigenmann, 1927
 Hemibrycon huambonicus (Steindachner, 1882)
 Hemibrycon inambari Bertaco & L. R. Malabarba, 2010
 Hemibrycon jabonero L. P. Schultz, 1944
 Hemibrycon jelskii (Steindachner, 1876)
 Hemibrycon loisae (Géry, 1964) 
 Hemibrycon metae G. S. Myers, 1930
 Hemibrycon microformaa Román-Valencia & Ruiz-C., 2007 
 Hemibrycon mikrostiktos Bertaco & L. R. Malabarba, 2010
 Hemibrycon paez Román-Valencia & Arcila-Mesa, 2010
 Hemibrycon palomae Román-Valencia, García-Alzate, Ruiz-C. & Taphorn, 2010
 Hemibrycon plutarcoi (Román-Valencia, 2001) 
 Hemibrycon polyodon (Günther, 1864)
 Hemibrycon rafaelense Román-Valencia & Arcila-Mesa, 2008
 Hemibrycon raqueliae Román-Valencia & Arcila-Mesa, 2010
 Hemibrycon sanjuanensis Román-Valencia, Ruiz-C., Taphorn & García-Alzate, 2014  
 Hemibrycon santamartae Román-Valencia, Ruiz-C., García-Alzate & Taphorn, 2010 
 Hemibrycon sierraensis García-Alzate, Román-Valencia & Taphorn, 2015 
 Hemibrycon surinamensis Géry, 1962
 Hemibrycon taeniurus (T. N. Gill, 1858)
 Hemibrycon tridens C. H. Eigenmann, 1922 (Jumping tetra)
 Hemibrycon velox Dahl, 1964
 Hemibrycon virolinica Román-Valencia & Arcila-Mesa, 2010
 Hemibrycon yacopiae Román-Valencia & Arcila-Mesa, 2010

References

Characidae
Taxa named by Albert Günther
Taxa described in 1864